An audio conversion app (also known as an audio converter) transcodes one audio file format into another; for example, from FLAC into MP3. It may allow selection of encoding parameters for each of the output file to optimize its quality and size. An audio converter uses at least two sets of audio codecs to decode the source file format and to encode the destination file. 

Audio converters include:
 AIMP
 Audacity
 Brasero
 CDex
 Exact Audio Copy
 FFmpeg
 FL Studio
 foobar2000
 FormatFactory
 Freemake Audio Converter
 Free Studio
 fre:ac
 iTunes
 k3b
 MediaCoder
 MediaHuman Audio Converter
 MediaMonkey
 SoX 
 VLC Media Player
 Winamp
 WMA Convert
 XMedia Recode

See also
Comparison of free software for audio
List of music software

References 

Audio conversion software